Ayvalık is a seaside town on the northwestern Aegean coast of Turkey. It is a district of Balıkesir province. The town centre is connected to Cunda Island by a causeway and is surrounded by the archipelago of Ayvalık Islands, which face the nearby Greek island of Lesbos

Ayvalık ('Quince Orchard') was an ancient Aeolian Greek port-town, called . Its name was changed to Ayvalık in the Ottoman era. The Greeks knew Cunda Island as Moschonisia (literally "The Perfumed Islands") while the Turks called it Alibey Island (Alibey Adası).

Under the Ottomans Ayvalık had a flourishing olive-oil-production industry and the chimneys of the old factories can still be seen about town. In modern times production has revived in a smaller-scale boutique format. 

Daily ferries operate between Ayvalık and Mytilene on nearby Lesbos Island, Greece, during the summer with a reduced service in winter.

The nearest airport to Ayvalık is Balıkesir Koca Seyit Airport (EDO) near Edremit.

Geography
Ayvalık is the southernmost district of Balıkesir province and lies between Edremit Gulf and Dikili Gulf of the Aegean Sea. Its centre is situated on a narrow coastal plain surrounded by low hills to the east which are covered with pine and olive trees. Ayvalık is surrounded by the archipelago of the Ayvalık Islands (the largest of which is Cunda Island) in the west, and by a narrow peninsula in the south named the Hakkıbey Peninsula. 

South of Ayvalık are Altınova and Küçükköy/Sarımsaklı which have long pristine beaches. To the north are Gömeç, Burhaniye and Edremit. Dikili district of Izmir Province is to the south of Ayvalık.  To the east of Ayvalık lies Bergama, with the remains of ancient Pergamon. 

The Greek island of Lesbos is west of Ayvalık and connected to it by ferry.

Climate 
The region has a typical Mediterranean climate with mild and rainy winters and hot, dry summers.

History

Prehistory and classical antiquity 
Archeological studies in the region have shown that Ayvalık and its environs were inhabited in the prehistoric era. 
Joseph Thacher Clarke believed that he had identified Ayvalık as the site of Kisthene, which was mentioned by Strabo as a ruinous place beside a harbour beyond Cape Pyrrha. However, Engin Beksaç of Trakya University preferred to site Kisthene at Kız Çiftlik, near the centre of Gömeç.

In his survey of the prehistoric and protohistoric settlements on the southern side of the Gulf of Adramytteion (Edremit) carried out in the 1990s and early 2000s, Beksaç studied the Ayvalık region. The survey identified several different settlements near the centre of Ayvalık which appear to relate to the Early Classical period. However, some settlements near the centre of Altınova were related to the prehistoric period, especially the Bronze and Iron Ages. Kortukaya was identified in the survey as one of the most important settlements in the area and one that aids in the understanding of the interaction between the peoples of the interior and of the coast. The same is true of Yeni Yeldeğirmeni, another settlement near the centre of Altınova.

Beksaç identified traces of a hill fort on Çıplak Island (Chalkys). Some Late Bronze Age and Early Iron Age pottery fragments related to the Aeolians were also found here. Two tiny settlements, near the centre of Ayvalık, formed part of the peraia of Mytilene.

Pordoselene, on the eastern side of Cunda  Island, near the sea, was another important settlement in Antiquity. All the archaeological data was related to the Classical and Medieval Ages.

During the Byzantine period, the constant threat posed by Arab and Turkish piracy prevented the islet settlements from growing larger. Only Cunda Island could maintain a higher level of habitation as it is the largest and the closest islet to the mainland.

Early Turkish periods 
After the Byzantine period, the region came under the rule of the Anatolian beylik of Karasi in the 13th century . Later it was annexed to the territory of the Ottoman beylik (principality), which would become the Ottoman Empire.

1770 Battle of Çeşme and aftermath 
In 1770 the Ottoman navy suffered a major defeat against the Russians at Çeşme. The Ottoman admiral Cezayirli Gazi Hasan Pasha and the men who survived the disaster were lodged on their way back to the capital Constantinople by an Ayvalık priest. Hasan Pasha did not forget the kindness shown to his sailors in their hour of need, and when he became Grand Vizier, he granted virtual autonomy to the Greeks of Ayvalık in 1773, paving the way for it to become an important centre of cultures for that community during the late 18th, 19th and early 20th centuries. Until 1922 Ayvalık remained an almost entirely Greek settlement.

1821 Greek struggle for independence
Following riots In 1821, the Greek Christian male population was massacred by the Turks, and the women and children were sent into slavery. The then British Ambassador Lord Strangford reported that Osman Pasha accepted the submission of the Aivaliotes, until he could  get fresh instructions from Constantinople. However a squadron of Greek insurgents appeared, persuading the inhabitants to hope that it had come to their rescue, and that another revolt might meet with greater success. They accordingly rose en masse, and about fifteen hundred Turks were killed. But the appearance of the squadron turned out to have been merely accidental and it soon sailed away. The Turks then recovered their courage, and an indiscriminate massacre of the Greeks followed.

World War I and its aftermath
As of 1920, Ayvalık's population was estimated at 60,000. Its small port was used to export soap, olive oil, animal hides and flour. The British described Aivali (Ayvalık) and nearby Edremid (Edremit) as having the finest olive oil in Asia Minor and reported large exports of it to France and Italy. This industry suffered during the First World War due to the deportation of the local Christian population (some of whom fled to the nearby Greek islands), who were the main producers of olive oil. Alarmed at the decline of the industry, the Turkish government brought back 4,500 Greek families in order to resume olive oil production. But although these repatriated Greeks were paid wages, they were not allowed to live in their own homes and were kept under official surveillance 

On 29 May 1919 the town was occupied by the Greek Army, only to be reoccupied by the Turkish forces under the command of Mustafa Kemal Atatürk  on 15 September 1922. Some of the population managed to escape to Greece. However, many of the local men were seized by the Turkish Army and died on death marches into the interior of Anatolia. Among the victims were the Christian clergy and the local metropolitan bishop, Gregory Orologas. 

Following the Turkish War of Independence, the Greek population and their properties in the town were exchanged for a Muslim population from Greece, and other formerly held Ottoman Turkish lands, under the 1923 agreement for the Exchange of populations between Greece and Turkey. Most of the new population consisted of Greek Muslims from Mytilene (Lesbos), Crete and Macedonia. Until recently Greek could still be heard being spoken in the streets. Many of the town's older mosques are Greek Orthodox churches that have been given a new use.

History of Altınova

Until the early 1920s Altınova was a village called "Ayazmend". However, during Atatürk's visit to the village, he was so impressed by its golden colour and the fertility of the Madra River's delta, that he called it the "Golden Delta," hence, Altınova. 

Altınova had its own separate municipality within Ayvalık district until Balıkesir turned into a metropolitan city in 2014. With the local elections of 2014, Altınova Municipality ceased to exist and merged with Ayvalik Municipality.

Modern Ayvalık

Today, the population of Ayvalık is close to 80,000, which significantly increases during the summer due to tourism. Ayvalık and its environs are famous for high quality olive oil production, which provides an important source of income for the local population. Ayvalık and the numerous islets encircling the bay area are popular holiday resorts. The largest and most important of these islets is Cunda Island (Alibey Island) which is connected to Lale Island, and thence to the mainland, by a bridge and causeway built in the late 1960s. This was the first bridge in Turkey to connect lands separated by a strait. Both Ayvalık and Cunda Island are famous for their seafood restaurants which line the seashore.

In recent years, Ayvalık has also become increasingly attractive to scuba divers.

Ayvalık International Music Academy (AIMA) was established in September 1998. Students receive master-instructed classes for violin, viola and cello. 

USA-based Harvard University and Turkey's Koç University run a Harvard-Koç University Intensive Ottoman & Turkish Summer School on Cunda Island every summer.

Ayvalık is also a member of the Norwich-based European Association of Historic Towns and Regions (EAHTR).

Attractions

In Ayvalık and Cunda 
Both Ayvalık and Cunda have a rich heritage of lovely old stone houses built by the lost Greek population and still often called collectively Rum Evleri (Greek Houses). There are also a number of large and imposing Greek Orthodox churches, some of which have been converted into mosques. In the centre of town the Ayios Yannis Kilise became the Saatlı Cami (Clock Mosque) while Ayios Yorgis became the Çınarlı Cami (Plant Tree Mosque). The Taksiyarhis Kilise (Church of the Archangels) is now a museum. The Faneromanı (Ayazma) Kilise is derelict.

On Cunda there is another fine Taksiyarhis Kilise (Church of the Archangels) which was very obviously once at the very heart of the local community. 

Cunda Island has a number of meyhanes with a very Greek feel to them as well as the Taş Kahve (Stone Teahouse) overlooking the harbour. In the back streets of Ayvalık the Şeytanın Kahvesi (Devil's Teahouse) is similarly Greek in atmosphere. It featured in a Turkish TV series called İki Yaka Bir İsmail (Two Continents, One İsmail).

Both Ayvalık itself and Cunda Island have attractive fishing harbours full of colourful boats. A few restaurants sell the papalina (whitebait) which is a local speciality.

Around Ayvalık 
The ruins of three important ancient cities lie within a short drive of Ayvalık: Assos and Troy are to the north, while Pergamon (modern Bergama) is to the east. Mount Ida (Turkish: Kaz Dağı), which played an important role in ancient Greek mythology and folk tales, is also near Ayvalık (to the north) and can be seen from many points in and around the town centre. 

The Gulf of Edremit and the coastal resort towns of Dikili (near ancient Atarneus) and Foça (ancient Phocaea) are also within driving distance for daily excursions.

Olive cultivation 
Ayvalık is said to have had millennia of experience in olive cultivation and now has over 2.5 million trees covering  or 41.3% of the region. Hundreds of these trees are over 500 years old. Commercial production began in the 1950s and became prominent in the 1960s. The area is now the second largest producer of olives in Turkey.

The Ayvalık olive (24% and a good pollinator) is among the ten main cultivars in Turkey. 80% of the fruit is processed for oil, 20% for table olives,. The others are Çekiste (26% yield with 1,300,000 trees), Çelebi (400, 000 trees and a 20% yield ), Domat, Erkence (25% yield and good pollinator with 3,000,000 trees), Gemlik (29% yield and a good pollinator), Izmir Sofralik (20% yield), Memecik, Memeli (20% yield and a good pollinator), and Uslu (900 000 trees).

Notable people
Photis Kontoglou, Greek writer, painter and iconographer
Elias Venezis, Greek author
Gregory (Orologas) of Kydonies, Metropolitan of Kydonies,  ethnomartyr, who arranged for majority of Greek population to leave for Greece via the International Red Cross, but was himself executed by Turkish authorities
Stratos Pagioumtzis, Greek rebetiko singer
Konstantinos Tombras, operator of first printing press in the town and first press in Greece
Georgios Tombras, Greek soldier of Macedonian Struggle and First Balkan War
Marco Misciagna, Italian virtuoso violist, was the first and only person to have received honorary citizenship of town of Ayvalık.
Efstratios Pissas, Greek revolutionary of Greek War of Independence and later lieutenant general.

See also
 Ayvalık Islands
 Cunda Island
 Marinas in Turkey
 Ayvalık Strait Bridge
 Sarimsakli

Notes

External links

AYKUSAD, Ayvalık Association of Culture and Arts (Turkish)
Pictures of Ayvalık
Pictures of Ayvalık and Alibey Island (Turkish)
Cunda Island
Panoramic pictures of Cunda Island (Turkish)

 
Populated coastal places in Turkey
Seaside resorts in Turkey
Aegean Sea port cities and towns in Turkey
Populated places in Balıkesir Province
Districts of Balıkesir Province
Former Greek towns in Turkey
World Heritage Tentative List for Turkey
Important Bird Areas of Turkey